The Special Operations Groups (GOE) are the special operations forces of the Spanish Army.

These units should not be confused with the similar-sounding Grupo Especial de Operaciones (GEO) and Grupos Operativos Especiales de Seguridad (GOES), two police forces, or the Spanish Navy's Unidad de Operaciones Especiales (UOE).

Organization
The three Special Operations Groups are subordinated to the Special Operations Command (Mando de Operaciones Especiales - MOE).

Units in 1989
The Special Operations Groups were Ranger type units that specialized in counter-insurgency and guerrilla warfare tactics.

 1st Special Operations Group "Ordenes Militares" (in Madrid)
 2nd Special Operations Group "Santa Fé" (in Granada)
 3rd Special Operations Group "Valencia" (in Alicante)
 4th Special Operations Group "Almogávares" (in Barcelona)
 5th Special Operations Group "San Marcial" (in Burgos)
 6th Special Operations Group "La Victoria" (in A Coruña)
 7th Special Operations Company (in Palma de Mallorca)
 81st Special Operations Company (in Tenerife)
 82nd Special Operations Company (in Las Palmas)

Notes

External links
Mando de Operaciones Especiales (official site)

Army units and formations of Spain
Special forces of Spain
Military units and formations established in 1977